Ommatoptera is a South American genus of katydids in the subfamily Pterochrozinae.

Species
, Orthoptera Species File lists:
 Ommatoptera boraceana Piza, 1979
 Ommatoptera elegans (Vignon, 1923)
 Ommatoptera laurifolia Pictet, 1888
 Ommatoptera mutila (Vignon, 1923)
 Ommatoptera pictifolia Walker, 1870
 Ommatoptera picturata (Serville, 1838)
 Ommatoptera pusilla (Vignon, 1923)

References

Pterochrozinae
Orthoptera of South America
Tettigoniidae genera